Bolshoye Ozero (Olokül) is a rural locality (a village) in Askinsky Selsoviet, Askinsky District, Bashkortostan, Russia. The population was 15 as of 2010. There are only 2 streets in the village.

Geography 
Bolshoye Ozero is located 24 km northwest of Askino (the district's administrative centre) by road. Tulguzbash is the nearest rural locality.

References 

Rural localities in Askinsky District